Alstroemeria achirae is a flowering plant, a herbaceous, perennial and rhizomatous species belonging to the family Alstroemeriaceae. It is endemic to Chile, particularly the Maule Region.

Description 
The plant is about 12 cm tall with linear-lanceolate leaves of green or reddish-green colour with smooth or little-undulated edges. The inflorescence is yellow with pink shades towards the apex and with pink strips on the upper third. The anthers are thick and yellow. It flowers between December and February.

Taxonomy 
Alstroemeria achirae was described by Mélica Muñoz-Schick and Brinck, and published in Gayana, Botanic 57(1): 56–57, f. 2. 2000.

Etymology 
The plant was named Alstroemeria in honour of the Swedish botanist baron Clas Alströmer (Claus von Alstroemer) by his friend Carl Linnaeus. The epithet achirae refers to the similarity of the tepals with the flowers of the plant known as "achira" (Canna).

Distribution 
Its distribution is restricted to the location of the type used by Muñoz Schick and Brinck in the description in Gayana Botanic, which is the summit of Los Queñes mountain, commune of Teno, Region of the Maule, Chile. It has also been found in the valley of the Teno River, from Romeral to Los Queñes.

References

External links 
 Images in Google

achirae
Flora of Chile
Plants described in 2000